William James Kirkpatrick (27 February 1838 – 20 September 1921) was an American hymnwriter of Irish birth. He partnered with John R. Sweney to produce and publish over 1,000 gospel hymn songs and over sixty hymnal books.

Life and career
Kirkpatrick was born in the Parish of Errigal, Keerogue, County Tyrone, Ireland to a schoolteacher and musician, Thomas Kirkpatrick and his wife, Elizabeth Storey.  The family immigrated to Philadelphia on 5 August 1840, living first in Duncannon, Pennsylvania. William did not accompany his parents on the initial immigration as he was too young and they wished to be settled before bringing him to America.  They did, however, give birth to a daughter on the ship in transit. William was exposed to and given formal training in music at a very young age. In 1854, he moved to Philadelphia to study music and carpentry. It was here that he studied vocal music under Professor T. Bishop. Kirkpatrick was a versatile musician playing the cello, fife, flute, organ, and violin. He joined the Harmonia and the Haydn Sacred Music Societies where he was exposed to many great composers. In 1855, he became involved in the Wharton Street Methodist Episcopal Church serving the choir with his musical talent and teaching Sunday school.

Beginning in 1858, Kirkpatrick began working with A.S. Jenks who helped him publish his first collection of hymns, Devotional Melodies, in 1859. His involvement with the Harmonia Society introduced him to another man, Dr. Leopold Meignen, under whose tutelage he devoted himself primarily to the study of music focusing on theory and composition.

In 1861, William Kirkpatrick married his first wife. Not long after the marriage, he enlisted in the 91st Regiment of the Pennsylvania Volunteers as a Fife-Major. This lasted until October 1862, when under general orders, the position was terminated. He returned to Philadelphia and supported his wife by working in carpentry. Over the next 11 years, Kirkpatrick was elected lead organist for the Ebenezer Methodist Episcopal Church, studied the pipe organ, continued in vocal lessons, and began publishing more and more hymns. It was also during this time that he was introduced to John R. Sweney. They soon became partners in their musical careers. The death of Kirkpatrick’s wife in 1878 acted as a catalyst in his life to give up the trade and devote himself fully to music and composition.

Between 1880 and 1897, Sweney and Kirkpatrick published 49 major books. It was also during this time that Kirkpatrick was given command over all of the music at Grace Methodist Episcopal church. He married again in 1893 and became a world traveler with his wife. Over the years he published close to 100 major works and many annual works such as anthems for Easter, Christmas, and children’s choirs.

William J. Kirkpatrick died on 20 September 1921. He told his wife that night that he had a tune running through his head and he wanted to write it down before he lost it. His wife retired to bed and awoke in the middle of the night to find that he was not there. She went to his study to find him, and when she did, he was slumped over on his desk, dead. His interment was located in West Laurel Hill Cemetery near Philadelphia.

A story behind the song
Kirkpatrick participated in many of the Camp meetings the Methodist churches held. He often led the music portion of the meeting and enlisted the help of soloists and other musicians to perform for the attenders. During one of these meetings, he became saddened by his observation of the soloist, who would perform the required songs and then leave without staying to hear the preacher. William feared that this young man did not really know Christ and so he began to pray that God would somehow get a hold of the soloist's heart. One evening while he was praying, a song began to form in his mind. He quickly jotted down the lyrics and asked the soloist to sing the song that night. The lyrics of the song convicted the young man's heart and he ended up staying and listening to the message. When the preacher gave the altar call at the end of the night, the soloist got up and went to the front of the tent and accepted Jesus into his heart. The lyrics that so touched this young man, and many people since, are: "I've wandered far away from God, Now I'm coming home; The paths of sin too long I've trod, Lord, I'm coming home. Coming home, coming home, Nevermore to roam; Open now Thine arms of love, Lord, I'm coming home." The song, Lord, I'm Coming Home, was based on the story of the Prodigal Son found in Luke 15.

Contribution to hymnody

Among the many hymns that he contributed to, these are some of the most notable

 “A Wonderful Savior is Jesus My Lord”
 “Away in a Manger”
 “I am Not Skilled to Understand”
 “Jesus Saves! (We Have Heard the Joyful Sound)”
 “Lead Me to Calvary”
 “My Faith has Found a Resting Place”
 “'Tis So Sweet to Trust in Jesus”
 “Blessed Be Thy Name”
 “Halleluiah! Amen!”
 “The Comforter Has Come”
 “Will Your Anchor Hold”
 “Give Me Thy Heart”
 “Lord, I'm Coming Home”
 “Redeemed”
 “His Grace Aboundeth More”
 “Singing I Go”
 “O To Be Like Thee”
 “We Have an Anchor”
 “Stepping in the Light”
 "The Lord is in His Holy Temple"

References

 Center for Church Music. http://www.songsandhymns.org/hymns/detail/away-in-a-manger
 “William J. Kirkpatrick.” The Cyber Hymnal. http://www.hymntime.com/tch/bio/k/i/r/kirkpatrick_wj.htm
 Hall, J. H.. Biography of Gospel Song and Hymn Writers. New York: Fleming H. Revell, 1914.
 Reynolds, William J. Songs of Glory. Grand Rapids: Baker Book House, 1990.
 "Sing to the Lord". Nazarene Hymnal, Kansas City, Lillenas Publishing Company, 1993.
 Terry, Lindsay. Stories Behind Popular Songs and Hymns. Grand Rapids: Baker Book House, 1990.

 "Kirkpatrick, William J(Ames) (27 Feb. 1838, Co. Tyrone, Ireland - 20 Sept. 1921, Germantown, Pa.)." The Harvard Biographical Dictionary of Music, edited by Don Michael Randel, Harvard University Press, 2003. Credo Reference, http://search.credoreference.com.contentproxy.phoenix.edu/content/entry/harvbiodictmusic/kirkpatrick_william_j_ames_27_feb_1838_duncannon_pa_20_sept_1921_germantown_pa/0. Accessed 19 Dec 2016.

External links

 
 
 
 
 

1838 births
1921 deaths
19th-century American writers
American cellists
American flautists
American Christian hymnwriters
American male organists
American male songwriters
American male violinists
American music publishers (people)
American performers of Christian music
Burials at West Laurel Hill Cemetery
People from Perry County, Pennsylvania
Songwriters from Pennsylvania